Christian Schiønning (died 1 March 1817) was a governor of the Danish Gold Coast, a Danish Crown Colony.  He governed from the colony's capital, Fort Christiansborg.

Schiønning as governor
In 1811, during his term as governor, Schiønning was forced to pay a ransom of one hundred ounces of gold to the Empire of Ashanti for the release of the commandant of Fort Konigenstein, the Danish fort at Ada, who had helped Know Saffatchi, king of the Akwapim, escape from the army of Apoko, an Ashanti general under Asantehene Osei Bonsu.

Notes

References
 http://www.worldstatesmen.org/Ghana.html#Danish
 

1817 deaths
Governors of the Danish Gold Coast
Year of birth missing